Juan Francisco de Padilla y San Martín, O. de M. (August 16, 1646 – 1700) was a Roman Catholic prelate who was Bishop of Santa Cruz de la Sierra (1699–1700) and Bishop of Puerto Rico (1683–1699).

Biography
Juan Francisco de Padilla y San Martín was born in Lima, Peru. In 1666, he was ordained a priest in the Order of the Blessed Virgin Mary of Mercy. On May 22, 1683, he was selected by the King of Spain and confirmed on November 15, 1683, by Pope Innocent XI as Bishop of Puerto Rico. In 1684, he was consecrated Bishop by Savio Millini, Archbishop (Personal Title) of Orvieto. On June 1, 1699, he was selected by the King of Spain and confirmed by Pope Innocent XII as Bishop of Santa Cruz de la Sierra. He was Bishop of Santa Cruz de la Sierra until his death in 1700.

References

External links and additional sources
 (for Chronology of Bishops) 
 (for Chronology of Bishops) 
 (for Chronology of Bishops) 
 (for Chronology of Bishops) 

1646 births
1700 deaths
Bishops appointed by Pope Innocent XI
Bishops appointed by Pope Innocent XII
Mercedarian bishops
Clergy from Lima
17th-century Roman Catholic bishops in Puerto Rico
17th-century Roman Catholic bishops in Bolivia
Roman Catholic bishops of Puerto Rico
Roman Catholic bishops of Santa Cruz de la Sierra